A swing skirt is a vintage knee-length retro skirt typical of the 1960s, but first introduced in the 1930s.

This circular skirt tended to swing when the wearer was in motion, movement induced by the use of numerous pleats or tucks.

References

Bibliography

Skirts
1960s fashion